The Dog Letter (Faroese: hundabrævið) is a Faroese document concerning keeping dogs on the isles. It was written between AD 1350–1400. The document mentions several Faroese villages and islands.

The text

References

14th-century documents
History of the Faroe Islands